Solarte may refer to:

Yangervis Solarte (born 1987), Venezuelan baseball player in Major League Baseball
Solarte Island, an island off the eastern coast of Panama

Basque-language surnames